Kehri Jones (born November 30, 1993) is an American bobsledder. She won gold at the 2017 IBSF World Championships in Königssee alongside Elana Meyers in the two-women bobsled event.

References 

1993 births
American female bobsledders
Living people
People from Fort Hood, Texas
Baylor Bears women's track and field athletes
Track and field athletes from Texas
21st-century American women